A rikishi is a professional sumo wrestler.

Rikishi may also refer to:

Rikishi (wrestler) (born 1965), American professional wrestler
Rikichi Andō, alternatively Ando Rikishi (1884–1946), general in the Imperial Japanese Army and 19th and final Japanese Governor-General of Taiwan from 30 December 1944 to October 1945

See also
Nio, or Kongōrikishi, two wrath-filled and muscular guardians of the Buddha standing today at the entrance of many Buddhist temples in East Asian Buddhism in the form of frightening wrestler-like statues